Horatio Norris Dumbleton (23 October 1858 – 18 December 1935) was an English first-class cricketer who was a right-handed batsman who bowled slow underarm, although which arm he bowled with is unknown.

Dumbleton represented Hampshire in one first-class match in 1884 against Somerset. In his only first-class match Dumbleton made 16 runs, scoring seven runs in the Hampshire first innings and nine runs in the second innings, leaving him with a career average of exactly eight. At a time when an over consisted of four legitimate deliveries, Dumbleton bowled two overs that went for fourteen runs.

Dumbleton died in Winchester, Hampshire on 18 December 1935. At his death he was described as a colonel in the Royal Engineers.

References

External links
Horatio Dumbleton at Cricinfo
Horatio Dumbleton at CricketArchive

1858 births
1935 deaths
Sportspeople from Firozpur
People from Punjab, India
English cricketers
Hampshire cricketers
Royal Engineers officers